Columbus Lighthouse (meaning "Lighthouse to Columbus") is a mausoleum monument located in Santo Domingo Este, Dominican Republic, in tribute to Christopher Columbus.

Construction began in 1986, using plans drawn in 1931 by Scottish architect J.L. Gleave. In time for the 500th anniversary of Columbus's first voyage, the monument was inaugurated in 1992. It was funded by the Latin American states and the total cost of construction was approximately US$70 million.

The monument's lighthouse-style features projecting beams of light, forming a cross shape, which are so powerful that they can be seen from neighboring Puerto Rico.

Overview

The cross footprint represents the Christianization of the Americas. There are 157 beams of light that emanate towards the sky from the structure and a rotating beam, which can be seen from space.

According to the Dominican authorities, remains of Christopher Columbus are sheltered at the lighthouse. However, Spanish authorities have proved through DNA tests that the remains in the Cathedral of Seville are the real remains of Columbus. Researchers point out that this strong evidence does not completely rule out the possibility of the bones in Santo Domingo also belonging to the explorer.
The Dominican authorities have not allowed the same DNA tests to be done to the remains in the lighthouse, so it is impossible to know if the remains of Columbus are divided or if the remains in the lighthouse belonged to another person.
 The monument is both a mausoleum and a museum showcasing objects, including a boat from Cuba and Colombian jewelry.

Once a year, on Columbus Day, the remains are displayed in their crypt (behind a sheet of glass).

History

The Dominican historian Antonio Delmonte y Tejada, in his book History of Santo Domingo, published in 1852, expressed the idea of erecting a monument in honor of Columbus in Santo Domingo. In 1914, the American, Pulliam William Ellis, began selling the idea of building a monumental beacon in the first city of the New World to the American press. The idea became universally accepted during the 1923 celebration of the Fifth International Conference in Chile, when it was decreed that this monument should be built in cooperation by all governments and peoples of the Americas.

Scottish architect Joseph Lea Gleave won the competition among 455 participants from 48 countries. The ceremony was held in Brazil in 1931, and the judges included distinguished architects, such as Horacio Acosta y Lara (Uruguay), Eliel Saarinen (Finland), and Frank Lloyd Wright (USA). However, by 1950, only eight countries had made contributions, totaling less than $15,000. Yet, the Dominican government forged ahead with the project, and in 1948, the foundations of the monument were inaugurated. After 1948, there was growing instability in the country and the political situation made it impossible to resume construction, until 1986. During the government of Joaquín Balaguer, construction resumed under the supervision of the Dominican architect Teófilo Carbonell, and culminated in the construction of the monument in 1992; in time for the celebration of the quincentennial discovery of the Americas.

The monument, though originally conceived by Gleave as a mausoleum, was adapted to house a permanent collection of exhibitions from each country of the Americas, as well as other European and Asian countries, as requested by former President Balaguer. These exhibitions house items of cultural heritage from each country; Tony Horwitz wrote in 2008 that the United States's exhibition included a handful of small photographs of Independence Day celebrations, as well as many poster-sized reproductions of newspaper front pages reporting on the September 11, 2001, terrorist attacks.

References

Sources

External links

Museums in the Dominican Republic
Buildings and structures completed in 1992
Buildings and structures in Santo Domingo Province
Architecture in the Dominican Republic
Tourist attractions in Santo Domingo Province
Tourism in the Dominican Republic
Burial monuments and structures in the Dominican Republic
Mausoleums in the Dominican Republic
Cultural depictions of Christopher Columbus